"Ievan polkka" (Finnish for "Ieva's Polka") is a popular Finnish song with lyrics printed in 1928 and written by Eino Kettunen to a traditional Finnish polka tune. The song is sung in an Eastern Savonian dialect spoken in North Karelia. It's sung from the point of view of a young man, about a woman called Ieva (dialectal for the name Eva or Eeva in standard Finnish) who sneaks out and dances the polka with him all night. The song is often mistaken for a traditional folk song, but the lyrics by Eino Kettunen are still under copyright. Later, a scat singing version of the song by the band Loituma was incorporated into the viral animation Loituma Girl, sung by Hatsune Miku, with Otomania arranged the music and providing Miku's voice manipulation, bringing the tune into worldwide popular culture.

Origin

In South Karelia, Ievan Polkka is also known as "Savitaipaleen polkka", due to its similarity to a tune of that name. The melody also resembles that of the Russian folk dance Смоленский гусачок (The Smolyanin Gosling).

The melody can be traced back to the 18th century and the Viipuri Province, when the border with the Kingdom of Sweden ran west of the province. The number of Russian soldiers stationed in the border area outnumbered the locals for many decades. At the beginning of the 19th century, collectors of Finnish folk dances and songs remarked that all the dances in the area of Luumäki-Savitaipale were Russian, and thus the collectors didn't record them. However, the polka genre is of a much later date. Polka was introduced into Northern Europe during the late 19th century, which implies that the actual tune, as it is known today, originates from this era.

Popularity
Owing to its viral exposure in popular culture, Ievan Polkka has become one of the most famous Finnish songs in the world.

Very popular after World War II, the song was almost forgotten during the late 1970s and 1980s. The song resurfaced after an a cappella performance by the Finnish quartet Loituma, which was first released on their debut album, Loituma, in 1995. The Loituma lyrics and arrangement are under copyright and published by Warner Chappell Music outside the Nordic countries. The album was released in the United States as Things of Beauty in 1998.

The Loituma version of the song acquired great international popularity as part of an Internet phenomenon in the spring of 2006, when the Loituma Girl (also known as Leekspin), a looped animation of anime character Orihime Inoue from the Bleach series twirling either a spring onion (in the Japanese original) or a leek (in the English dub), set to a scat singing section of the song was posted on Russian LiveJournal. For the animation, only the second half of the fifth stanza (four lines) and the complete sixth stanza (eight lines) are used. It quickly became a global hit and the song soon enjoyed overwhelming popularity as a ringtone. Since then, the song has been circulating under several misspelled variations of its original name, including "Ievas Polkka", "Levan Polkka" (due to the similarity between the sans-serif lowercase L (l) and uppercase i (I)) and "Leekspin Song". 

Fans of the Vocaloid software have made Vocaloid voicebanks, such as Megurine Luka, Kagamine Rin, and Kagamine Len cover the song. The most popular Vocaloid cover belonged to Otomania, who in 2007 made Hatsune Miku sing it with the nonsensical lyrics by Loituma. The official music video has garnered more than 6 million views on Niconico by March 2022. It features a chibi derivative of Hatsune Miku, officially known as Hatchune Miku, holding a spring onion in reference to Loituma Girl, and is the origin of her association with spring onions or leeks. Its popularity resulted in its use by the Vocaloid rhythm game series Hatsune Miku: Project DIVA, mainly as tutorial music. It has also been used in a commercial promoting the LG G5 smartphone.

In 2012, the Finnish folk metal band Korpiklaani recorded a cover of the song for their eighth album Manala. Mobile ringtones based on various mixes of "Ievan Polkka" gained a wide popularity among Russian and Commonwealth of Independent States mobile subscribers in late 2006. The tune is also the theme song to the Internet sitcom Break a Leg; it was remixed by musician Basshunter of Sweden, DJ Sharpnel of Japan, and Beatnick of Poland; and a version of the song performed by Anne Kulonen was part of a Ready Brek television advert aired in the United Kingdom.

In 2016, Erika Ikuta, a member of the Japanese girl group Nogizaka46, sang Ievan Polkka as a part of her private segment on a web TV show titled Nogizaka46 Hours TV. This song then became well known among Nogizaka46's fans. She later sang it on several occasions, including on the "JUNK Bananaman no Bananamoon GOLD" radio show, "Nogizaka Under Construction" on TV Aichi, and on "Banana Zero Music" on NHK.

In December 2018, a video of the visually impaired Turkish street musician Bilal Göregen performing Ievan Polkka on a darbuka was uploaded on YouTube. The video received over 1.9 million views in one year. A version of this video posted on Twitter in October 2020, with "CatJAM" / "Vibing Cat" (a white cat rhythmically bobbing its head) edited in, gained viral popularity as a meme template on Instagram and Reddit. On November 1, 2020, Göregen uploaded a version of this video to his own YouTube channel. As of March, 2022, the video has had over 82 million views. After this video was posted, interest in the song peaked once again based on Google search results.

Loituma version

Charts

Other versions
 Matti Jurva (1937)
 Onni Laihanen (1947)
 Jorma Ikävalko (1950)
 Lumberjack Band (1952)
 Arttu Suuntala (1966)
 Pauli Räsänen (1972)
 Sukellusvene (as "Savitaipaleen polkka") (1979)
 DJ Sharpnel (as "PRETTY GREEN ONIONS") (2006)
 Holly Dolly (as "Dolly Song [Ieva's Polka]") (2006)
 Hatsune Miku (2007)
 Kagamine Rin/Len (2007)
 Kuunkuiskaajat (2010)
 Korpiklaani (2012)
 Salut Salon (2013)
 Busy Signal (2014)
 Liza, the Fox-Fairy (2015) Soundtrack 
 Erika Ikuta (2016)
 Eugene Magalif (az "EVA's POLKA Variations for Flute Orchestra and Blown Bottles" published by FORTON Music (UK)) (2016)
Marina Devyatova (as "Finnish Polka") (2016)
 Otava Yo  (as "Finnish Polka") (2017)
 Tuuletar (2018)
 Shirakami Fubuki (2019)
 Bilal Göregen (2019)
 Akai Haato (2020)
 The Kiffness (2020)
 Sea Shanty (cover Girl With The Leek published by Spinnin' Records) (2021)

See also
 Säkkijärven polkka

References

Songs about classical music
Finnish songs
1930s songs
Polkas
Karelian-Finnish folklore
Internet memes introduced in 2006